Asalat Pur Village (Village ID 64035), commonly known as Khawad, is a census village, populated by Jaats, (gotra- Bud Chauhan) (बडचौहान in Hindi) This village is located in South West district Najafgarh Area. According to the 2011 census it has a population of 422 living in 85 households. Its main product is vegetable farming.

References

Cities and towns in South West Delhi district